Clara Erskine Clement Waters (August 28, 1834, in St. Louis, Missouri – February 29, 1916, in Brookline, Massachusetts) was an American author and traveler.

Early life
On August 28, 1834, Clement was born as Clara Erskine in St. Louis, Missouri. Clement's father was John Erskine, a businessman. Clement's mother was Harriet Bethiah (Godfrey) Erskine. She was educated at home by private tutors.

Career 
Clement's writing career in 1869 with Simple Story of the Orient.

Personal life 
In 1852, Clement married James Hazen Clement, a businessman.  They moved to Newton, Massachusetts. 
After the death of her first husband, in 1882 Clement married Edwin Forbes Waters, author and owner of the Boston Daily Advertiser. They resided in Cambridge, Massachusetts.

Clement made extensive tours in Europe, visited Palestine and Turkey in 1868, and traveled round the world in 1883/4.  Her travels continued later in life.

Selected works

 Simple Story of the Orient, her first work, printed privately (1869)
 Handbook of Legendary and Mythological Art (Boston, 1871)
 Painters, Sculptors, Architects, Engravers, and their Works (1874; 9th ed., 1892)
 Artists of the Nineteenth Century and their Works, with Laurence Hutton (1879)
 Eleanor Maitland, a novel (1881)
 Life of Charlotte Cushman (1882)
 History of Egypt
 Hand-Books of Painting, Sculpture, and Architecture (3 vols., 1883–86)
 Christian Symbols and Stories of the Saints (1886)
 Stories of Art and Artists (1886)
 "The Queen of the Adriatic or Venice, Mediaeval and Modern" (1893)
Naples: The City of Parthenope and Its Environs (1894)
 Women Artists in Europe and America (1903)
 Women in the fine arts, from the Seventh Century B.C. to the Twentieth Century A.D. (1904)
 Women in the Fine Arts (1906)

She also translated a volume of Kenan's lectures and Dosia's Daughter, a novel by Henri Gréville, and edited a translation of Carl von Lützow's Treasures of Italian Art.

Notes

Attribution

References

External links

 
 
 

1834 births
1916 deaths
19th-century American novelists
American art historians
Novelists from Massachusetts
Writers from St. Louis
19th-century American historians
20th-century American novelists
American women historians
Women art historians
American women novelists
20th-century American women writers
19th-century American women writers
Novelists from Missouri
20th-century American non-fiction writers